The 1997 Grand Prix motorcycle racing season was the 49th F.I.M. Road Racing World Championship season.

Season summary
A fourth world championship in a row for Honda's Mick Doohan with another dominating performance. He broke Giacomo Agostini's record for victories in one season with 12 wins. It was also dominating year for Honda with eight of the top ten riders aboard Hondas. The Yamaha and Suzuki teams were in disarray. Kenny Roberts left Yamaha to start his own venture with a lightweight, three-cylinder Modenas. Wayne Rainey's team was left with the inconsistent Norifumi Abe and Sete Gibernau, a rookie. Daryl Beattie wasn't able to come back from head injuries and retired at the end of the year while Anthony Gobert failed a drug test and was dismissed by the Suzuki team. The Elf team soldiered on with their Swiss-Auto V4 but Aprilia decided to pull their V twin from the 500 class at the end of the year.

Max Biaggi had a harder time defending his title from Tetsuya Harada and Ralf Waldmann, not clinching the title until the last race of the year. A new star emerged from the 125 class with Valentino Rossi winning 11 races for a commanding win on an Aprilia.

1997 Grand Prix season calendar
The following Grands Prix were scheduled to take place in 1997:

†† = Saturday race

Calendar changes
 The Malaysian Grand Prix replaced the Japanese Grand Prix with hosting the opening round Grand Prix.
 The Indonesian Grand Prix was moved back from 7 April to 28 September.
 The Austrian Grand Prix was moved forward from 4 August to 1 June.
 The Australian Grand Prix moved from the Eastern Creek Raceway to the Phillip Island Grand Prix Circuit.

1997 Grand Prix season results

†† = Saturday race

Participants

500 cc participants

Standings

Riders' standings

500cc

Scoring system
Points were awarded to the top fifteen finishers. A rider had to finish the race to earn points.

250cc

Scoring system
Points were awarded to the top fifteen finishers. A rider had to finish the race to earn points.

125cc

Scoring system
Points were awarded to the top fifteen finishers. A rider had to finish the race to earn points.

Manufacturers' standings

500cc

250cc

125cc

References
 
 

Grand Prix motorcycle racing seasons
Grand Prix motorcycle racing season